Hadassah means myrtle in Hebrew. It is given as the Hebrew name of Esther in the Hebrew Bible.

Hadassah may also refer to:

 Hadassah (dancer) (1909–1992), Jerusalem-born American dancer and choreographer
 Hadassah Lieberman (born 1948), wife of US Senator Joe Lieberman
 Hadassah Rosensaft (1912–1997), Polish Holocaust survivor
 Hadassah Women's Zionist Organization of America, a United States Jewish women's organization
 Hadassah Magazine, a magazine published by Hadassah
 Hadassah Medical Center, a medical center in Israel funded by Hadassah
 Hadassah (typeface) or Hadassah Friedlaender, a typeface for Hebrew
 Hadassah: One Night with the King, a novel based upon the Biblical Book of Esther

See also

Book of Esther
Hadass